The men's 50 kilometres walk race walk event at the 1960 Olympic Games took place on September 7.  The event was held in a final only format.

Results

Final

Key: OR = Olympic record; DQ = disqualified; DNF = did not finish

References

M
Racewalking at the Olympics
Men's events at the 1960 Summer Olympics